Taoyuan is a railway station in Taoyuan, Taiwan served by Taiwan Railways Administration. The station was 
the second busiest station in 2020 in terms of passenger volume, behind Taipei. The Taoyuan MRT is planned to be extended to Taoyuan.

Structure 
There is one island platform and two side platforms. The side platform of Linkou line is outside the station owing to free service. The station is undergoing a massive construction as of 2015. Two elevated island platforms will be built to replace the existing platforms. The tracks for two Taoyuan MRT underground lines are also being built. Because of the construction, the station is temporarily relocated until 2020, when the new platforms and tracks are expected to be completed.

Service 
All classes of trains stop at the station with the exception of one daily Puyuma service. Easycard usage for trains along West Coast line, Yilan line, and Pingtung line are also available at this station.

History 
The station began to operate in 1893 during the late Qing rule. In 1905, during Japanese rule, a new wooden terminal was built to replace the existing terminal. It was the terminal station of the Linkou line. Post World War II, the terminal went through another major renovation in 1962, and was used until 2015, when the construction of new platforms began.

Around the station
 Hutou Mountain Park
 Chaoyang Forest Park
 Sanmin Sports Park
 Yangming Sports Park
 Taoyuan Night Market
 Taoyuan City Stadium
 Taoyuan Confucian Temple
 Shin Kong Mitsukoshi Department Store
 FE21 Department Store
 Tonlin Plaza
 Taoyuan Main Bus Station

Gallery

See also
 List of railway stations in Taiwan

References

Railway stations opened in 1893
Railway stations served by Taiwan Railways Administration
Railway stations in Taoyuan City
Station
1893 establishments in Taiwan